Deyrollius is a genus of beetles in the family Buprestidae, containing the following species:

 Deyrollius alvarengai Cobos, 1972
 Deyrollius angustithorax Cobos, 1979
 Deyrollius anthaxoides Cobos, 1972
 Deyrollius bahianus Cobos, 1979
 Deyrollius canescens Cobos, 1972
 Deyrollius cupreoviridis (Thomson, 1879)
 Deyrollius descarpentriesi Cobos, 1979
 Deyrollius hercules Cobos, 1972
 Deyrollius mnizechi Thery, 1934
 Deyrollius nicki Cobos, 1957
 Deyrollius niger (Kerremans, 1903)
 Deyrollius nitidicollis (Gory & Laporte, 1839)
 Deyrollius paraguayensis Obenberger, 1932
 Deyrollius pujoli Cobos, 1979
 Deyrollius striatus (Gory & Laporte, 1839)
 Deyrollius vianai Cobos, 1972

References

Buprestidae genera